Leigh Miners Rangers are a community amateur rugby league football club from Leigh in the Metropolitan Borough of Wigan, Greater Manchester. The club currently competes in the National Conference League, the National Conference Premier Division. The club also operates an A team, Masters, an Under 18's team, and numerous junior teams.  Miners Rangers also field a successful Ladies side in the RFL Women's Super League Group 2 .

The club was founded in 1966 as Leigh Miners Welfare. The club later merged with the junior club Leigh Rangers, and changed its name to Leigh Miners Rangers.

The club's junior section has produced lots of players who went on to play rugby league professionally, most notably former internationals Denis Betts, Darren Wright, Tommy Martyn, Scott Naylor, Steve Blakeley, Mickey Higham, Paul Rowley and Stuart Littler.

Honours
 National Conference League Premier Division Grand Final
 Winners (1): 2015
 National Conference League Premier Division
 Winners (2): 2004–05, 2015
 Conference Challenge Trophy
 Winners (3): 2012, 2013, 2015
 BARLA National Cup
 Winners (2): 1973–74, 1982–83
 BARLA Lancashire Cup
 Winners (4): 1975–76, 1978–79, 1981–82, 1987–88

References

External links
Official website

Rugby league teams in Greater Manchester
Sport in the Metropolitan Borough of Wigan
BARLA teams
Rugby clubs established in 1966
1966 establishments in England
Women's rugby league teams in England
English rugby league teams